Robert Krzysztof Gumny (born 4 June 1998) is a Polish professional footballer who plays as a defender for Bundesliga club FC Augsburg and the Poland national team.

Club career
In September 2020, Gumny joined Bundesliga club FC Augsburg on a five-year contract. The transfer fee paid to Lech Poznań was reported as €2 million plus possible bonuses.

International career
He made his debut for Poland national football team on 11 November 2020 in a friendly game against Ukraine, as a starter.

Career statistics

Club

International

Honours

Club
Lech Poznań
 Polish Super Cup: 2016

References

External links

Living people
1998 births
Footballers from Poznań
Polish footballers
Poland youth international footballers
Poland under-21 international footballers
Poland international footballers
Association football defenders
Lech Poznań II players
Lech Poznań players
Podbeskidzie Bielsko-Biała players
FC Augsburg players
Ekstraklasa players
I liga players
II liga players
III liga players
Bundesliga players
2022 FIFA World Cup players
Polish expatriate footballers
Expatriate footballers in Germany
Polish expatriate sportspeople in Germany